Lexington Avenue Line refers to the following transit lines:
IRT Lexington Avenue Line (rapid transit), in Manhattan
BMT Lexington Avenue Line (former rapid transit), in Brooklyn
Lexington Avenue Line (surface) (bus, formerly streetcar)